Hatim ibn Harthamah ibn al-Nadr was a provincial governor for the Abbasid Caliphate.

Hatim was the son of Harthamah ibn al-Nadr al-Jabali, who was appointed governor of Egypt in 847. When Harthamah fell ill in 849, he appointed his son as his successor, and following Harthamah's death Hatim was confirmed as governor by the Turkish general Itakh. After holding the governorship for slightly over a month, however, Hatim was dismissed and replaced with 'Ali ibn Yahya al-Armani.

Notes

References 
 
 

Abbasid governors of Egypt
9th-century Abbasid governors of Egypt
9th-century Arabs